Sergeant Władysław Grydziuszko (1910–1946) was a soldier in the Polish Army during World War II. He was born on September 6, 1910 in the small rural village of Mikulicze, Poland. Prior to military service, Władysław worked as a master tailor until he was enlisted with the Polish Forces in 1939. On August 28, 1939 he was called from reserve and together with the Polish Police unit participated in the 1939 Invasion of Poland campaign. Grydziuszko was taken prisoner of war by the former Soviet Red Army and was held in the USSR. Following his ordeal on the basis of the Sikorski–Mayski agreement of July 30, 1941, Władysław Grydziuszko was released for the purpose of joining the Polish Armed Forces in USSR. From 1942 to 1944 Władysław received military training by the British Army in the Middle East. Then in 1944 to 1946 he embarked on the Italian campaign.

Battle at Monte Cassino

Grydziuszko was primarily posted to the Fifth Field Artillery Regiment, and was later transferred to the Seventh on January 1, 1942.  At Monte Cassino, the Polish Army was advancing against the Hitler Line, and on May 23 the Poles finally managed to break through attacking the village of Piedimonte. Władysław, along with many other soldiers in the II Corps used stables and other local buildings to camouflage tanks and attack the advancing enemy from behind. In the following day the 5th Canadian (Armoured) Division breached the lines and on May, 25 the Poles cleared way for an advance onward to Rome. Władysław Grydziuszko, one of the tank commanders, was awarded the Cross of Valour for showing tremendous courage on the battlefield. During the battle, Grydziuszko was lightly wounded on October 17, 1944 and suffered minor spinal cord injuries from Nazi artillery fire. However, he quickly recovered and returned to the forces to serve for another two years.

Other war efforts

Death and aftermath

Following the end of World War II, Władysław Grydziuszko was killed in an accident near Treia, Macerata in Italy on January 29, 1946. During a routine 2nd Armoured Brigade (Poland) training period, Władysław was killed when he fell underneath one of his tanks breaking his spine at the neck. The military considered his death "Killed in Action " (KIA) because he was on duty. His death was instantaneous, and soon afterward there was a memorial service held in his honor. Some 400 soldiers attended his funeral. He was buried in the Polish cemetery in Loreto, Italy on January 30, 1946. The two witnesses of his death was a future Polish Politician named Zygmunt Ostrowski :pl:Zygmunt Ostrowski and Michał Matusiewicz.

Works cited

Polish military personnel of World War II
Recipients of the Cross of Valour (Poland)
1910 births
1946 deaths
Accidental deaths in Poland